"DINK" is an acronym that stands for "double income, no kids" or "dual income, no kids". It describes a couple without children living together while both partners are receiving an income; because both of their wages are coming into the same household, they are free to live more comfortably than couples who live together and spend their money on raising their children. The term was coined at the height of yuppie culture in the 1980s. The Great Recession solidified this social trend, as more couples waited longer to have children or chose not to have children at all.

Disadvantages
Households without children in the United States aren't eligible for many government subsidies. For example, households with children in the United States receive tax credits such as the child tax credit.

Variations
"DINKY" means "double income, no kids yet", implying that the couple in question is childless only temporarily and intends to have children later, rather than eschewing having children entirely. The British radio sitcom Double Income, No Kids Yet bore this name.

"GINK" means "green inclinations, no kids", referring to those who choose not to have children for environmental reasons.

"DINKWAD" means "Double income, no kids, with a dog"

"DINKWADACS" means "Double income, no kids, with dogs and cats" 

Some marketers have proposed "yappie" ("young affluent parent", adapted from "yuppie") as a term to describe similar couples who do have children.

See also

 Childlessness
 Doug, a TV series featuring recurring characters Bud and Tippi Dink, their surname being a reference to the acronym
 Fairly OddParents, a TV series on which the next door neighbor characters 'The Dinklebergs' are also named in reference to the acronym, being a childless couple who can afford many luxuries
 Emerging adulthood
 FIRE movement
 Total fertility rate
 Voluntary childlessness

References

Acronyms
Family
Social class subcultures
Upper class
1980s neologisms
Childfree